Shirley Temple Black (born Shirley Jane Temple; April 23, 1928 – February 10, 2014) was an American actress, singer, dancer, and diplomat who was Hollywood's number one box-office draw as a child actress from 1934 to 1938. Later, she was named United States ambassador to Ghana and Czechoslovakia, and also served as Chief of Protocol of the United States.

Temple began her film career at the age of three in 1931. Two years later, she achieved international fame in Bright Eyes, a feature film produced specially for her talents. She received a special Juvenile Academy Award in February 1935 for her outstanding contribution as a juvenile performer in motion pictures during 1934. Film hits such as Curly Top and Heidi followed year after year during the mid-to-late 1930s. Temple capitalized on licensed merchandise that featured her wholesome image; the merchandise included dolls, dishes, and clothing. Her box-office popularity waned as she reached adolescence. She appeared in 29 films from the ages of 3 to 10 but in only 14 films from the ages of 14 to 21. Temple retired from film in 1950 at the age of 22.

In 1958, Temple returned to show business with a two-season television anthology series of fairy tale adaptations. She made guest appearances on television shows in the early 1960s and filmed a sitcom pilot that was never released. She sat on the boards of corporations and organizations, including The Walt Disney Company, Del Monte Foods, and the National Wildlife Federation.

She began her diplomatic career in 1969, when she was appointed to represent the United States at a session of the United Nations General Assembly, where she worked at the U.S. Mission under Ambassador Charles W. Yost. In 1988, she published her autobiography, Child Star.

Temple was the recipient of numerous awards and honors, including the Kennedy Center Honors and a Screen Actors Guild Life Achievement Award. She is 18th on the American Film Institute's list of the greatest female American screen legends of classic Hollywood cinema.

Early years
Shirley Jane Temple was born on April 23, 1928, at Santa Monica Hospital (now UCLA Medical Center) in Santa Monica, California, the third child of homemaker Gertrude Temple and bank employee George Temple. The family was of Dutch, English, and German ancestry. She had two brothers: John and George, Jr. The family moved to Brentwood, Los Angeles.

Her mother encouraged her to develop her singing, dancing, and acting talents, and in September 1931 enrolled her in Meglin's Dance School in Los Angeles. At about this time, Shirley's mother began styling her daughter's hair in ringlets.

While at the dance school, she was spotted by Charles Lamont, who was a casting director for Educational Pictures. Temple hid behind the piano while she was in the studio. Lamont took a liking to Temple, and invited her to audition; he signed her to a contract in 1932. Educational Pictures launched its Baby Burlesks, 10-minute comedy shorts satirizing recent films and events, using preschool children in every role. Glad Rags to Riches was a parody of the Mae West feature She Done Him Wrong, with Shirley as a saloon singer. Kid 'n' Africa had Shirley imperiled in the jungle. The Runt Page was a pastiche of The Front Page. The juvenile cast delivered their lines as best they could, with the younger players reciting phonetically.

Temple became the breakout star of this series, and Educational promoted her to 20-minute comedies. These were in the Frolics of Youth series with Frank Coghlan Jr.; Temple played Mary Lou Rogers, the baby sister in a contemporary suburban family. To underwrite production costs at Educational Pictures, she and her child co-stars modeled for breakfast cereals and other products. She was lent to Tower Productions for a small role in her first feature film (The Red-Haired Alibi) in 1932 and, in 1933, to Universal, Paramount, and Warner Bros. Pictures for various parts including an uncredited role as a child whose doll's head is shot off right in front of her in To the Last Man (1933) starring Randolph Scott and Esther Ralston.

Film career
Fox Film songwriter Jay Gorney was walking out of the viewing of Temple's last Frolics of Youth picture when he saw her dancing in the movie theater lobby. Recognizing her from the screen, he arranged for her to have a screen test for the movie Stand Up and Cheer! Temple arrived for the audition on December 7, 1933; she won the part and was signed to a $150-per-week contract that was guaranteed for two weeks by Fox Film Corporation. The role was a breakthrough performance for Temple. Her charm was evident to Fox executives, and she was ushered into corporate offices almost immediately after finishing "Baby, Take a Bow", a song-and-dance number she performed with James Dunn.

Roles

Most of the Shirley Temple films were inexpensively made at $200,000 or $300,000 apiece and were comedy dramas with songs and dances added, sentimental and melodramatic situations, with few production values. Her film titles are a clue to the way she was marketed—Curly Top and Dimples, and her "little" pictures such as The Little Colonel and The Littlest Rebel. Shirley often played a fixer-upper, a precocious Cupid, or the good fairy in these films, reuniting her estranged parents or smoothing out the wrinkles in the romances of young couples. Elements of the traditional fairy tale were woven into her films: wholesome goodness triumphing over meanness and evil, for example, or wealth over poverty, marriage over divorce, or a booming economy over a depressed one. As the girl matured into a pre-adolescent, the formula was altered slightly to encourage her naturalness, naïveté, and tomboyishness to come forth and shine while her infant innocence, which had served her well at six but was inappropriate for her tweens (or later childhood years), was toned down.

Biographer John Kasson argues:

Biographer Anne Edwards wrote about the tone and tenor of Shirley Temple films:

Edwards pointed out that the characters created for Temple would change the lives of the cold, the hardened, and the criminal with positive results. Her films were seen as generating hope and optimism, and President Franklin D. Roosevelt said, "It is a splendid thing that for just fifteen cents, an American can go to a movie and look at the smiling face of a baby and forget his troubles."

Finances

On December 21, 1933, her contract was extended to a year at the same $150 per week with a seven-year option, and her mother Gertrude was hired at $25 per week as her hairdresser and personal coach. Released in May 1934, Stand Up and Cheer! became Shirley's breakthrough film. She performed in a short skit in the film alongside popular Fox star James Dunn, singing and tap dancing. The skit was the highlight of the film, and Fox executives rushed her into another film with Dunn, Baby Take a Bow (named after their song in Stand Up and Cheer!). Shirley's third film, also with Dunn, was Bright Eyes, a vehicle written especially for her.

After the success of her first three films, Shirley's parents realized that their daughter was not being paid enough money. Her image also began to appear on numerous commercial products without her legal authorization and without compensation. To get control over the corporate unlicensed use of her image and to negotiate with Fox, Temple's parents hired lawyer Lloyd Wright to represent them. On July 18, 1934, the contractual salary was raised to $1,000 per week; meanwhile, her mother's salary was raised to $250 per week, with an additional $15,000 bonus for each movie finished. Temple's original contract for $150 per week is equivalent to $2,960 in 2019, adjusted for inflation; however, the economic value of $150 during the Great Depression was equal to around $18,500 in 2019 money due to the punishing effects of deflation—six times higher than a surface-level conversion. The subsequent salary increase to $1,000 weekly had the economic value of $123,000 in 2019 money, and the bonus of $15,000 per movie (equal to $296,000 in 2019) had the purchasing power of $1.85 million (in 2019 money) in a decade when a quarter could buy a meal. Cease and desist letters were sent out to many companies and the process was begun for awarding corporate licenses.

On December 28, 1934, Bright Eyes was released. The movie was the first feature film crafted specifically for Temple's talents and the first where her name appeared over the title. Her signature song, "On the Good Ship Lollipop", was introduced in the film and sold 500,000 sheet-music copies. In February 1935, Temple became the first child star to be honored with a miniature Juvenile Oscar for her film accomplishments, and she added her footprints and handprints to the forecourt at Grauman's Chinese Theatre a month later.

Superstar

In 1935, Fox Films merged with Twentieth Century Pictures to become 20th Century-Fox. Producer and studio head Darryl F. Zanuck focused his attention and resources upon cultivating Shirley's superstar status. She was said to be the studio's greatest asset. Nineteen writers, known as the Shirley Temple Story Development team, made 11 original stories and some adaptations of the classics for her.

In keeping with her star status, Winfield Sheehan built Temple a four-room bungalow at the studio with a garden, a picket fence, a tree with a swing, and a rabbit pen. The living room wall was painted with a mural depicting her as a fairy-tale princess wearing a golden star on her head. Under Zanuck, she was assigned a bodyguard, John Griffith, a childhood friend of Zanuck's, and, at the end of 1935, Frances "Klammie" Klampt became her tutor at the studio.

1935–1937
In the contract they signed in July 1934, Temple's parents agreed to four films a year (rather than the three they wished). A succession of films followed: Now and Forever starring Gary Cooper and Carole Lombard (Temple was billed third with her name above the title beneath Cooper's and Lombard's), The Little Colonel, Our Little Girl, Curly Top (with the signature song "Animal Crackers in My Soup"), and The Littlest Rebel in 1935. Curly Top was Temple's last film before the merger between 20th Century Pictures, Inc. and the Fox Film Corporation. Both Curly Top and The Littlest Rebel were named to Variety's list of top box office draws for 1935. In 1936, Captain January, Poor Little Rich Girl, Dimples, and Stowaway were released.

Based on Temple's success, Zanuck increased budgets and production values for her films. By the end of 1935, her salary was $2,500 per week. In 1937, John Ford was hired to direct the sepia-toned Wee Willie Winkie (Temple's own favorite), and an A-list cast was signed, which included Victor McLaglen, C. Aubrey Smith and Cesar Romero. Elaborate sets were built for the production at the famed Iverson Movie Ranch in Chatsworth, Calif., with a rock feature at the heavily filmed location ranch eventually being named Shirley Temple Rock. The film was a critical and commercial hit.

Temple's parents and Twentieth Century-Fox sued British writer/critic Graham Greene for libel and won. The settlement remained in trust for the girl in an English bank until she turned 21, when it was donated to charity and used to build a youth center in England.

Heidi was the only other Temple film released in 1937. Midway through shooting of the movie, the dream sequence was added to the script. There were reports that Temple herself was behind the dream sequence and she had enthusiastically pushed for it, but in her autobiography she vehemently denied this. Her contract gave neither her nor her parents any creative control over her movies. She saw this as Zanuck's refusal to make any serious attempt at building upon the success of her dramatic role in Wee Willie Winkie.

One of the many examples of how Temple was permeating popular culture at the time is the references to her in the 1937 film Stand-In: newly minted film studio honcho Atterbury Dodd (played by Leslie Howard) has never heard of Temple, much to the shock and disbelief of former child star Lester Plum (played by Joan Blondell), who describes herself as "the Shirley Temple of my day", and performs "On the Good Ship Lollipop" for him.

1938–1940

The Independent Theatre Owners Association paid for an advertisement in The Hollywood Reporter in May 1938 that included Temple on a list of actors who deserved their salaries while others' (including Katharine Hepburn and Joan Crawford) "box-office draw is nil".

That year, Rebecca of Sunnybrook Farm, Little Miss Broadway and Just Around the Corner were released. The latter two were panned by the critics, and Corner was the first of her films to show a slump in ticket sales. The following year, Zanuck secured the rights to the children's novel A Little Princess, believing the book would be an ideal vehicle for the girl. He budgeted the film at $1.5 million (twice the amount of Corner) and chose it to be her first Technicolor feature. The Little Princess was a 1939 critical and commercial success, with Shirley's acting at its peak.

Convinced that the girl would successfully move from child star to teenage actress, Zanuck declined a substantial offer from MGM to star her as Dorothy in The Wizard of Oz, and cast her instead in Susannah of the Mounties, her last money-maker for Twentieth Century Fox. The film was successful, but because she made only two films in 1939, instead of three or four, Shirley dropped from number one box-office favorite in 1938 to number five in 1939.

In 1939, she was the subject of the Salvador Dalí painting Shirley Temple, The Youngest, Most Sacred Monster of the Cinema in Her Time, and she was animated with Donald Duck in The Autograph Hound.
In 1940, Lester Cowan, an independent film producer, bought the screen rights to F. Scott Fitzgerald's Babylon Revisited and Other Stories for $80. Fitzgerald thought his screenwriting days were over, and, with some hesitation, accepted Cowan's offer to write the screenplay titled "Cosmopolitan" based on the short story. After finishing the screenplay, Fitzgerald was told by Cowan that he would not do the film unless Temple starred in the lead role of the youngster Honoria. Fitzgerald objected, saying that at age 12, the actress was too worldly for the part and would detract from the aura of innocence otherwise framed by Honoria's character. After meeting Shirley in July, Fitzgerald changed his mind, and tried to persuade her mother to let her star in the film. However, her mother demurred. In any case, the Cowan project was shelved by the producer. Fitzgerald was later credited with the use of the original story for The Last Time I Saw Paris starring Elizabeth Taylor.

In 1940, Shirley starred in two flops at Twentieth Century Fox—The Blue Bird and Young People. Her parents bought out the remainder of her contract, and sent her—at the age of 12—to Westlake School for Girls, an exclusive country day school in Los Angeles. At the studio, the girl's bungalow was renovated, all traces of her tenure expunged, and the building was reassigned as an office.

1941–1950: Final films and retirement
After her departure from Twentieth Century-Fox, Shirley was signed by MGM for her comeback; the studio made plans to team her with Judy Garland and Mickey Rooney for the Andy Hardy series. However, upon meeting with Arthur Freed for a preliminary interview, the MGM producer exposed his genitals to her. When this elicited nervous giggles in response, Freed threw her out and ended their contract before any films were produced. The next idea was teaming her with Garland and Rooney for the musical Babes on Broadway. Fearing that either of the latter two could easily upstage Temple, MGM replaced her with Virginia Weidler. As a result, her only film for Metro was Kathleen in 1941, a story about an unhappy teenager. The film was not a success, and her MGM contract was canceled after mutual consent. Miss Annie Rooney followed for United Artists in 1942, but was unsuccessful. The actress retired from films for almost two years, to instead focus on school and other activities.

In 1944, David O. Selznick signed Temple to a four-year contract. She appeared in two wartime hits: Since You Went Away, and I'll Be Seeing You. Selznick, however, became romantically involved with Jennifer Jones and lost interest in developing Temple's career. Temple was then lent to other studios for Kiss and Tell and The Bachelor and the Bobby-Soxer starring Cary Grant. The Cary Grant picture and Fort Apache starring John Wayne and Henry Fonda  were two of her few hit films at the time. Her then husband John Agar also appeared in Fort Apache. 

According to biographer Robert Windeler, her 1947–1949 films neither made nor lost money, but "had a cheapie B look about them and indifferent performances from her". Selznick suggested that she move abroad, gain maturity as an actress, and even change her name. He warned her that she was typecast, and her career was in perilous straits. After unsuccessfully auditioning for the role of Peter Pan on the Broadway stage in August 1950, Temple took stock and admitted that her recent movies had been poor fare. She announced her retirement from films on December 16, 1950.

Radio career
Temple had her own radio series on CBS. Junior Miss debuted March 4, 1942, in which she played the title role. The series was based on stories by Sally Benson. Sponsored by Procter & Gamble, Junior Miss was directed by Gordon Hughes, with David Rose as musical director.

Merchandise and endorsements

John Kasson states:

Ideal Toy and Novelty Company in New York City negotiated a license for dolls with the company's first doll wearing the polka-dot dress from Stand Up and Cheer! Shirley Temple dolls realized $45 million in sales before 1941 (equivalent to $ million in ). A mug, a pitcher, and a cereal bowl in cobalt blue with a decal of the little actress were given away as a premium with Wheaties.

Successful Shirley Temple items included a line of girls' dresses, accessories, soap, dishes, cutout books, sheet music, mirrors, paper tablets, and numerous other items. Before 1935 ended, the girl's income from licensed merchandise royalties would exceed $100,000, which doubled her income from her movies. In 1936, her income from royalties topped $200,000. She endorsed Postal Telegraph, Sperry Drifted Snow Flour, the Grunow Teledial radio, Quaker Puffed Wheat, General Electric, and Packard automobiles.

Alongside licensed merchandise came counterfeit items bearing Temple's likeness to capitalize on her fame, from dolls, clothing and other accessories to even cigars with her face printed on the label. Temple lamented in her memoirs that it "made no economic sense" to pursue litigation against those who made unlicensed goods under her name; a successful lawsuit was filed by Ideal Toy Company against a certain Lenora Doll Company which manufactured and sold Shirley Temple dolls without authorization, with Temple herself cited as a co-plaintiff befitting her celebrity status.

Myths and rumors
At the height of her popularity, Temple was the subject of many myths and rumors, with several being propagated by the Fox press department. Fox publicized her as a natural talent with no formal acting or dance training. As a way of explaining how she knew stylized buck-and-wing dancing, she was enrolled for two weeks in the Elisa Ryan School of Dancing.

False claims circulated that Temple was not a child, but a 30-year-old dwarf, due in part to her stocky body type. The rumor was so prevalent, especially in Europe, that the Vatican dispatched Father Silvio Massante to investigate whether she was indeed a child. The fact that she never seemed to miss any teeth led some people to conclude that she had all her adult teeth. Temple was actually losing her primary teeth regularly through her days with Fox, for example during the sidewalk ceremony in front of Grauman's Theatre, where she took off her shoes and placed her bare feet in the cement, taking attention away from her face. When acting, she wore dental plates and caps to hide the gaps in her teeth. Another rumor said her teeth had been filed to make them appear like baby teeth.

A rumor about Temple's trademark hair was that she wore a wig. On multiple occasions, fans yanked her hair to test the rumor. She later said she wished all she had to do was wear a wig. The nightly process she endured in the setting of her curls was tedious and grueling, with weekly vinegar rinses that stung her eyes.

Rumors spread that her hair color was not naturally blonde. During the making of Rebecca of Sunnybrook Farm, news spread that she was going to do extended scenes without her trademark curls. During production, she also caught a cold, which caused her to miss a couple of days. As a result, a false report originated in Britain that all of her hair had been cut off.

Television career

Between January 1958 and September 1961, Temple hosted and narrated a successful NBC television anthology series of fairy-tale adaptations called Shirley Temple's Storybook. Episodes ran one hour each, and Temple acted in three of the sixteen episodes. Temple's son made his acting debut in the Christmas episode, "Mother Goose". The series was popular but faced issues. The show lacked the special effects necessary for fairy tale dramatizations, sets were amateurish, and episodes were not telecast in a regular time-slot. The show was reworked and released in color in September 1960 in a regular time-slot as The Shirley Temple Show. It faced stiff competition from Maverick, Lassie, Dennis the Menace, the 1960 telecast of The Wizard of Oz, and the Walt Disney anthology television series however, and was canceled at season's end in September 1961.

Temple continued to work in television, making guest appearances on The Red Skelton Show, Sing Along with Mitch, and other shows. In January 1965, she portrayed a social worker in a pilot called Go Fight City Hall that was never released.

In 1999, she hosted the AFI's 100 Years...100 Stars awards show on CBS, and in 2001 served as a consultant on an ABC-TV production of her autobiography, Child Star: The Shirley Temple Story.

Motivated by the popularity of Storybook and television broadcasts of Temple's films, the Ideal Toy Company released a new version of the Shirley Temple doll, and Random House published three fairy-tale anthologies under her name. 300,000 dolls were sold within six months, and 225,000 books between October and December 1958. Other merchandise included handbags and hats, coloring books, a toy theater, and a recreation of the Baby, Take a Bow polka-dot dress.

Diplomatic career

Temple became active in the California Republican Party. In 1967, she ran unsuccessfully in a special election in California's 11th congressional district to fill the seat left vacant by the death from leukemia of eight-term Republican J. Arthur Younger. She ran in the open primary as a conservative Republican and came in second with 34,521 votes (22.44%), behind Republican law school professor Pete McCloskey, who placed first in the primary with 52,882 votes (34.37%) and advanced to the general election with Democrat Roy A. Archibald, who finished fourth with 15,069 votes (9.79%), but advanced as the highest-placed Democratic candidate. In the general election, McCloskey was elected with 63,850 votes (57.2%) to Archibald's 43,759 votes (39.2%). Temple received 3,938 votes (3.53%) as an independent write-in.

Temple was extensively involved with the Commonwealth Club of California, a public-affairs forum headquartered in San Francisco. She spoke at many meetings throughout the years, and was president for a period in 1984.

Temple got her start in foreign service after her failed run for Congress in 1967, when Henry Kissinger overheard her talking about South West Africa at a party. He was surprised that she knew anything about it. She was appointed as a delegate to the 24th United Nations General Assembly (September – December 1969) by President Richard M. Nixon and United States Ambassador to Ghana (December 6, 1974 – July 13, 1976) by President Gerald R. Ford. She was appointed first female Chief of Protocol of the United States (July 1, 1976 – January 21, 1977), and in charge of arrangements for President Jimmy Carter's inauguration and inaugural ball.

She served as the United States Ambassador to Czechoslovakia (August 23, 1989 – July 12, 1992), having been appointed by President George H. W. Bush, and was the first and only woman in this job. Temple bore witness to two crucial moments in the history of Czechoslovakia's fight against communism. She was in Prague in August 1968, as a representative of the International Federation of Multiple Sclerosis Societies, and was going to meet with Czechoslovakian party leader Alexander Dubček on the very day that Soviet-backed forces invaded the country. Dubček fell out of favor with the Soviets after a series of reforms, known as the Prague Spring. Temple, who was stranded at a hotel as the tanks rolled in, sought refuge on the roof of the hotel. She later reported that it was from there she saw an unarmed woman on the street gunned down by Soviet forces, the sight of which stayed with her for the rest of her life.

Later, after she became ambassador to Czechoslovakia, she was present during the Velvet Revolution, which brought about the end of communism in Czechoslovakia. Temple openly sympathized with anti-communist dissidents and was ambassador when the United States established formal diplomatic relations with the newly elected government led by Václav Havel. She took the unusual step of personally accompanying Havel on his first official visit to Washington, travelling on the same plane.

Temple served on boards of directors of large enterprises and organizations, such as The Walt Disney Company, Del Monte Foods, Bank of America, Bank of California, BANCAL Tri-State, Fireman's Fund Insurance, United States Commission for UNESCO, United Nations Association and National Wildlife Federation.

Personal life

In 1943, 15-year-old Temple met John Agar (1921–2002), an Army Air Corps sergeant, physical training instructor, and member of a Chicago meat-packing family. She married him at age 17 on September 19, 1945, before 500 guests in an Episcopal ceremony at Wilshire Methodist Church in Los Angeles. On January 30, 1948, Temple bore a daughter, Linda Susan. Agar became an actor, and the couple made two films together, Fort Apache (1948) and Adventure in Baltimore (1949), for RKO. Agar was reportedly alcoholic and had extramarital affairs. Temple divorced Agar on the grounds of mental cruelty in December 5, 1949, and was awarded custody of their daughter.

In January 1950, Temple met Charles Alden Black, a World War II Navy intelligence officer and Silver Star recipient who was Assistant to the President of the Hawaiian Pineapple Company. Conservative and patrician, he was the son of James Black, president and later chairman of Pacific Gas and Electric, and reputedly one of the richest young men in California. Temple and Black were married in his parents' Del Monte, California home on December 16, 1950, before a small assembly of family and friends.

The family moved to Washington, D.C., when Black was recalled to the Navy at the outbreak of the Korean War. On April 28, 1952, Temple gave birth to a son, Charles Alden Black Jr., in Washington. Following the war's end and Black's discharge from the Navy, the family returned to California in May 1953. Black managed television station KABC-TV in Los Angeles, and Temple became a homemaker. Their daughter, Lori, was born on April 9, 1954; she went on to be a bassist for the rock band the Melvins.

In September 1954, Charles Sr. became director of business operations for the Stanford Research Institute, and the family moved to Atherton, California. The couple were married for 54 years until his death on August 4, 2005, at his home in Woodside, California, of complications from a bone marrow disease.

Breast cancer
At age 44, in 1972, Temple was diagnosed with breast cancer. The tumor was removed and a modified radical mastectomy performed. At the time, cancer was typically discussed in hushed whispers, and Temple's public disclosure was a significant milestone in improving breast cancer awareness and reducing stigma around the disease. She announced the results of the operation on radio and television and in a February 1973 article for the magazine McCall's.

Death
Temple died at age 85 on February 10, 2014, at her home in Woodside, California. The cause of death, according to her death certificate released on March 3, 2014, was chronic obstructive pulmonary disease (COPD). Temple was a lifelong cigarette smoker but avoided displaying her habit in public because she did not want to set a bad example for her fans. She is buried at Alta Mesa Memorial Park.

Awards, honors, and legacy

Temple was the recipient of many awards and honors, including a special Juvenile Academy Award, the Life Achievement Award from the American Center of Films for Children, the National Board of Review Career Achievement Award, Kennedy Center Honors, and the Screen Actors Guild Life Achievement Award.

On March 14, 1935, Shirley left her footprints and handprints in the wet cement at the forecourt of Grauman's Chinese Theatre in Hollywood. She was the Grand Marshal of the New Year's Day Rose Parade in Pasadena, California, three times in 1939, 1989, and 1999. On February 8, 1960, she received a star on the Hollywood Walk of Fame.

In 1970, she received the Golden Plate Award of the American Academy of Achievement. In February 1980, Temple was honored by the Freedoms Foundation of Valley Forge, Pennsylvania.

On September 11, 2002, a life-size bronze statue of the child Temple by sculptor Nijel Binns was erected on the Fox Studio lot.

Her name is further immortalized by the mocktail named after her, although Temple found the drink far too sweet for her palate. In 1988, Temple brought a lawsuit to prevent a bottled soda version from using her name.

On June 9, 2021, Temple was featured on that day's Google Doodle in celebration of the opening anniversary of "Love, Shirley Temple” a special exhibit featuring a collection of her rare memorabilia at Santa Monica History Museum.

Filmography

See also

 List of former child actors from the United States
 List of oldest and youngest Academy Award winners and nominees

Notes

References

Bibliography 

 
 
 , primary source
 
 
 
 Kasson, John F. (2015) "Black, Shirley Temple" American National Biography (2015) online 
 Hatch, Kristen. (2015) Shirley Temple and the Performance of Girlhood (Rutgers University Press, 2015) x, 173 pp.

Further reading 

 
 Best, Marc (1971). Those Endearing Young Charms: Child Performers of the Screen. South Brunswick and New York: Barnes & Co. pp. 251–255.
 
 
 Dye, David (1988). Child and Youth Actors: Filmography of Their Entire Careers, 1914–1985. Jefferson, NC: McFarland & Co., pp. 227–228.
 
 Kasson, John F. The Little Girl Who Fought the Great Depression: Shirley Temple and 1930s America (2014) Excerpt 
 Minott, Rodney G. The Sinking of the Lollipop: Shirley Temple vs. Pete McCloskey (1968).

External links 

 
 
 
 Wee Willie Winkie at the Iverson Movie Ranch
 Norwood, Arlisha. "Shirley Temple". National Women's History Museum. 2017.

 
1928 births
2014 deaths
20th-century American actresses
20th-century American diplomats
20th-century American singers
20th-century American women singers
20th Century Studios contract players
Academy Honorary Award recipients
Academy Juvenile Award winners
Actresses from Santa Monica, California
Ambassadors of the United States to Czechoslovakia
Ambassadors of the United States to Ghana
American actor-politicians
American anti-communists
American child actresses
American child singers
American female dancers
American film actresses
American people of Dutch descent
American people of English descent
American people of German descent
American radio actresses
American tap dancers
American television actresses
American United Methodists
American women ambassadors
Articles containing video clips
California Republicans
Chiefs of Protocol of the United States
Conservatism in the United States
Dancers from California
Respiratory disease deaths in California
Deaths from chronic obstructive pulmonary disease
Ford administration personnel
George H. W. Bush administration personnel
Harvard-Westlake School alumni
Kennedy Center honorees
Members of the Junior League
Metro-Goldwyn-Mayer contract players
Nixon administration personnel
Screen Actors Guild Life Achievement Award
Writers from Santa Monica, California
Deaths from emphysema